Muribaculum is a genus from the family of Muribaculaceae (formerly Porphyromonadaceae), with one known species (Muribaculum intestinale).

References

Further reading 
 

Bacteroidia
Bacteria genera
Monotypic bacteria genera